Ulagam Sutrum Valiban is a 1973 Indian Tamil-language science fiction film directed and co-produced by M. G. Ramachandran. The film stars Ramachandran, Chandrakala, Manjula and Latha. It revolves around a scientist who discovers an energy harnessing formula, and seeks to keep his research from being abused by a rival scientist.

Ulagam Sutrum Valiban was released on 11 May 1973. It emerged a major box office success, with a theatrical run for over 200 days. Ramachandran won the Filmfare Special Award for Excellent Production Values.

Plot 
Murugan is an Indian scientist who has recently discovered how to store a part of the energy unleashed from lightning. He reports this at a Hong Kong scientists' conference. He subsequently announces that he will not reveal his discovery, since the world is at the brink of World War III and his research may be used for destructive purposes.

Another scientist, Bairavan, claims Murugan is falsely claiming that his research is successful. Murugan thus conducts a demonstration and destroys the vital research notes, which upsets other scientists. Bairavan offers $100 million to persuade him to sell the research to a foreign country, which Murugan refuses.

Murugan then departs with his girlfriend, Vimala for a world tour. He discloses to Vimala that he only pretended to destroy the research notes, and has actually kept them in a safe place. He indeed had plans of using them, to ensure that his research is used for productive purposes. Bairavan, who has been following them, overhears this and plans to steal the research notes. While in Singapore, Bairavan shoots Murugan with a special gun (not killing him). Vimala faints after witnessing the attack.

Murugan, who seemingly suffers from a mental disorder, is subsequently taken into Bairavan's custody.

Shortly, Vimala too is abducted by Bairavan. He expects her to cure Murugan, so that he could get information on the whereabouts of the research documents.

Raju, a CBCID officer and Murugan's younger brother, arrives in Singapore in search of his brother. How he finds his brother and what happens to others forms the rest of the story.

Cast 

Male cast
M. G. Ramachandran as Murugan and Raju
M. N. Nambiar as one of Bairavan's henchmen
S. A. Ashokan as Bairavan
R. S. Manohar as Lily's brother
Nagesh  as Markandeyan
V. Gopalakrishnan as the doctor and the gunsmith of Bairavan
Thengai Srinivasan as the driver and one of Bairavan's henchmen

Female cast
Chandrakala as Rathnadevi
Manjula as Vimala
Latha as Lily
Metta Roongrat as Metta (guest appearance)

Production 
Ulagam Sutrum Valiban is the second film directed by M. G. Ramachandran, and was originally titled Mele Aagaayam Kizhe Bhoomi. It was co-produced by R. M. Veerappan. J. Jayalalithaa, in an interview with the media, said that Ramachandran owed his popularity to her; irked by this, Ramachandran fired her from Ulagam Sutrum Valiban, and replaced her with Manjula. Filming began in 1970. The climax scene was shot at Expo '70. Ramachandran's brother M. G. Chakrapani served as production consultant.

Soundtrack 
The soundtrack was composed by M. S. Viswanathan. The first choice of Ramachandran for the soundtrack was Kunnakudi Vaidyanathan. Two songs, "Aval Oru Navarasa" and "Nilavu Oru", were originally intended for an shelved film of Ramachandran titled Inaindha Kaigal.

Release 
Ulagam Sutrum Valiban was released on 11 May 1973. The film was a major commercial success, and ran for over 200 days in theatres. In 2005, Mohanlal listed Ulakam Sutram Valibhan in his list of top ten best Indian films of all time, stating "I was a kid when I first saw this Tamil film, and I simply loved it. It has all the ingredients needed to entertain people."

Accolades 
 Best Film (Sirandha Thiraipadam)
 Best Director (M. G. Ramachandran) (Sirandha Iyakkunar)
 Best Producer (M. G. Ramachandran), under his Emgiyaar Pictures Limited (Sirandha Thayaripalar)
 Filmfare Special Award for Excellent Production Values – M. G. Ramachandran

Cancelled sequels 
Ramachandran intended to make a sequel to this film titled Kizhakku Africavil Raju, but the project never came to fruition when he was alive. An animated sequel with the same title was planned by Ishari K. Ganesh in the late 2010s, with a new script directed by M. Arulmoorthy. Sayyeshaa and Akshara Gowda were signed on to star opposite a computer-generated Ramachandran. The film did not complete production.

References

Bibliography

External links 
 

1970s science fiction films
1970s Tamil-language films
1973 films
Central Bureau of Investigation in fiction
Fictional portrayals of the Tamil Nadu Police
Films about World War III
Films directed by M. G. Ramachandran
Films scored by M. S. Viswanathan
Films set in Hong Kong
Films set in Osaka
Films set in Singapore
Films shot in Hong Kong
Films shot in Malaysia
Films shot in Osaka
Films shot in Singapore
Films shot in Thailand
Indian post-apocalyptic films
Indian science fiction films